Punta Grober is a mountain that is part of the Monte Rosa Alps in the Pennine Alps. It is located in Piedmont between the Valsesia and the Anzasca Valley.

Sources

Mountains of Piedmont
Alpine three-thousanders